The Little Indian Sioux River is a river in St. Louis County, Minnesota.  It originates at Chad Lake and flows into Lake Jeanette in the Jeanette State Forest at its mouth.

See also
List of rivers of Minnesota
List of longest streams of Minnesota
Little Sioux River (in southern Minnesota and Iowa)

References

Rivers of Minnesota